The canton of Blanzy is an administrative division of the Saône-et-Loire department, eastern France. It was created at the French canton reorganisation which came into effect in March 2015. Its seat is in Blanzy.

It consists of the following communes:
 
Les Bizots
Blanzy
Collonge-en-Charollais
Écuisses
Genouilly
Gourdon
Joncy
Marigny
Mary
Mont-Saint-Vincent
Montchanin
Le Puley
Saint-Eusèbe
Saint-Julien-sur-Dheune
Saint-Laurent-d'Andenay
Saint-Martin-la-Patrouille
Saint-Micaud

References

Cantons of Saône-et-Loire